Jenoah was an American indie rock band from Redlands, California, United States. They were signed to Drive-Thru Records through November 2006.  On November 30, 2006, the band announced via MySpace that they had broken up.

Discography

Morning Is When Jenoah Wakes Up
Shortly after being signed to Drive-Thru Records, Jenoah digitally released the EP, Morning Is When Jenoah Wakes Up,  as the first of two free downloadable EPs (the second being hellogoodbye's Hellogoodbye) on the label's homepage. The physical release was issued later with two bonus songs.  The album's cover art comes from a photo published on page 130 of the February 1966 issue of Playboy magazine.

Track listing
All songs written by Jenoah.
 "Wish for Alliance" – 2:51
 "Ex-Suits" – 3:58
 "Openly" – 3:33
 "Coughing Up Blood" – 3:23
 "Jamie" – 3:11

Bonus tracks
 "Wish For Alliance (Alternate Version)" – 3:03
 "Ex-Suits (Alternate Version)" – 4:16

Credits
Zachary Blizzard – drums, percussion, Vibra-Tones
Robbie Halbert – Guitar, Moog
Stephen Joshua Martinez – vocals, bass
Lucky Philip Rodrigues – Guitar, vocals

See also 
 Drive-Thru Records

External links
 Drive-Thru Records

American post-hardcore musical groups
Musical groups disestablished in 2006
Punk rock groups from California
Drive-Thru Records artists